Herbert Wetter (15 March 1891 – 5 September 1966) was a Norwegian freestyle swimmer. He competed in the men's 1500 metre freestyle event at the 1912 Summer Olympics. He represented the club Oslo IL.

References

External links
 

1891 births
1966 deaths
Olympic swimmers of Norway
Swimmers at the 1912 Summer Olympics
People from Nedre Eiker
Norwegian male freestyle swimmers
Sportspeople from Viken (county)
20th-century Norwegian people